SS and police commands were senior level commands of the SS that existed under the authority of the SS and police leaders.  The commands were first authorized in 1937 as extensions of the power granted to SS-Oberabschnitt commanders of the Allgemeine-SS (General-SS).  The SS and police leaders were drawn from the general-SS Abschnitt and Oberabschnitt commands; it was a common occurrence for the same SS officer to hold both posts.

The SS and police commands were technically under the authority of the Allgemeine-SS, however during time of war the post was granted authority over Waffen-SS commands.  In 1944, most SS and police leaders were granted equivalent Waffen-SS rank.

There were three levels of the SS and police commands: SS und Polizeiführer (SSPF), Höhere SS und Polizeiführer (HSSPF), and Höchste SS und Polizeiführer (HöSSPF).

Supreme SS and police commands

The Höchste SS und Polizeiführer (HöSSPF) commands were as follows:

 Italien
 Ukraine

Higher SS and police commands

The Höhere SS und Polizeiführer (HSSPF) commands were as follows:

 Adriatisches Küstenland
 Albanien
 Alpenland
 Belgien-Nordfrankreich
 Böhmen und Mähren
 Danmark
 Donau
 Elbe
 Frankreich
 Fulda-Werra
 Griechenland
 Kroatien
 Main
 Mitte
 Nord
 Nordost
 Nordsee
 Nordwest
 Ost
 Ostland und Rußland-Nord
 Ostsee
 Rhein-Westmark
 Rußland-Mitte
 Rußland-Süd
 Schwarzes-Meer
 Serbien, Sandschack und Montenegro
 Slowakien
 Spree
 Süd
 Südost
 Südwest
 Ungarn
 Warthe
 Weichsel
 West

A further command, known as Höhere SS und Polizeiführer z.b.V. Kaukasien was planned for activation in the Caucasus but was never formed.

SS and police commands

The SS und Polizeiführer (SSPF) commands were as follows:

 Aserbeidschan
 Awdejewka
 Bergvolker-Ordshonikidseo
 Bialystok
 Bozen
 Charkow
 Dnjepropetrowsk-Krivoi-Rog
 Estland
 Friaul
 Görz
 Istrien
 Kattowitz
 Kaukasien-Kuban
 Kertsch-Tamanhalbinsel
 Kiew
 Krakau
 Lemberg
 Lettland
 Litauen
 Lublin
 Metz
 Mitteitalien-Verona
 Mitte-Norwegen
 Mogilew
 Montenegro
 Nikolajew
 Nord-Kaukasien
 Nord-Norwegen
 Ober-Elsaß
 Oberitalien-Mitte
 Oberitalien-West
 Pripet
 Quarnero
 Radom
 Rowno
 Rostow-Awdejewka 
 Salzburg
 Sandschak
 Saratow
 Shitomir
 Stalino-Donezgebiet
 Stanislav-Rostow
 Süd-Norwegen
 Taurien-Krim-Simferopol
 Triest
 Tschernigow
 Warsaw
 Weißruthenien (also known as Minsk)
 Wolhynien-Brest-Litovsk

SS and police formations

 1st SS Police Regiment
 2nd SS Police Regiment
 3rd SS Police Regiment
 4th SS Police Regiment
 5th SS Police Regiment
 6th SS Police Regiment
 7th SS Police Regiment
 8th SS Police Regiment
 9th SS Police Regiment
 10th SS Police Regiment
 11th SS Police Regiment
 12th SS Police Regiment
 13th SS Police Regiment
 14th SS Police Regiment
 15th SS Police Regiment
 16th SS Police Regiment
 17th SS Police Regiment
 18th SS Police Regiment
 19th SS Police Regiment
 20th SS Police Regiment
 21st SS Police Regiment
 22nd SS Police Regiment
 23rd SS Police Regiment
 24th SS Police Regiment
 25th SS Police Regiment
 26th SS Police Regiment
 27th SS Police Regiment
 28th SS Police Regiment
 29th SS Police Regiment
 30th SS Police Regiment

Ethnic SS police formations

 SS Police Regiment Bozen
 SS Police Regiment Brixen
 SS Police Regiment Alpenvorland
 SS Police Regiment Schlanders

References
 Yerger, Mark C. Allgemeine-SS: The Commands, Units, and Leaders of the General SS, Schiffer Publishing (1997). 

 SS and Police Commands
 SS and Police Commands